Selina Chirchir (born August 28, 1968) is a retired Kenyan middle-distance runner and a marathoner. She competed at the 1984 Summer Olympics while still a schoolgirl at the Sing'ore Girls' Secondary School in Iten.

She won women's 800 metres at the 1986 World Junior Championships in Athletics and finished second in 1500 metres. The next year she won two gold medals (800 and 1500 metres) at the 1987 All-Africa Games, held in Nairobi, Kenya. At the 1987 World Championships she failed to make the final. At the 1996 Summer Olympics she represented Kenya at marathon, but did not finish. Her marathon record, 2:32:36, was run at the Houston Marathon in January, 1996.

In 1998, she won the San Francisco Marathon. She was still active in 2000, when she won the Trinidad and Tobago Marathon.

International competitions

References

External links
 

1968 births
Living people
Kenyan female middle-distance runners
Kenyan female long-distance runners
Olympic athletes of Kenya
Athletes (track and field) at the 1984 Summer Olympics
Athletes (track and field) at the 1996 Summer Olympics
African Games gold medalists for Kenya
African Games medalists in athletics (track and field)
Athletes (track and field) at the 1987 All-Africa Games
World Athletics U20 Championships winners